FusionDebug an interactive step debugger for CFML, compatible with Adobe ColdFusion, Railo and Lucee. It enables developers to step through code line-by-line, step into, over or out of code to better understand how code is running.

Features
 No code changes.
 Can debug Flex, Ajax, Web Service and Flash Remoting requests.
 Change variables on the fly.
 Debug requests from any user.
 Debug complex applications.
 View stack traces.

Release history
2013-October-21 : FusionDebug version 3.6 
2010-November-09 : FusionDebug version 3.5 
2009-November-27 : FusionDebug version 3.0.1 
2009-August-3 : FusionDebug version 3.0 
2007-May-25 : FusionDebug version 2.0.1 
2007 : FusionDebug version 2.0
2005 : FusionDebug version 1.0

References 

CFML programming language
Debuggers